Moel y Gydros is a hill located just outside the Snowdonia National Park on the Gwynedd / Conwy border in North Wales. The B4501, Frongoch to Cerrigydrudion road skirts the hills lower slopes.

Location
The bleak moorland of Mynydd Hiraethog, and the Clwydian Range is to the north, with the Dee Valley, Corwen and the Berwyn range to the east / southeast.

Ascent
The easy climb to the summit takes about 45 minutes steady walk. There is a farm vehicle access track that leads from the Cwmpenanner road to the summit where a small stone cairn can be found.

References

Mountains and hills of Gwynedd
Llandderfel